Aditya Narayan  (born 6 August 1987) is an Indian singer, host and actor. He is the son of singer Udit Narayan. He is known for hosting Indian Idol and participating in Fear Factor: Khatron Ke Khiladi 9.

Personal life
Narayan was born to singer Udit Narayan and Deepa Narayan. In November 2020, he announced his marriage with Shweta Agarwal to be held in December the same year. They married on 1 December 2020, in a close-knit ceremony in Mumbai attended by a small number of people. They had a child, a girl, in March 2022.

Career
Narayan's first playback song was for the Nepalese film Mohini in 1992 and then a Hindi film Rangeela with Asha Bhosle. Later in 1995 he performed a song for Akele Hum Akele Tum along with his father, Udit Narayan.

His acting career as a child began when Narayan was spotted by producer and director Subhash Ghai at the 1995 Filmfare Award function, as the final performer for the "Little Wonders" troupe. Ghai then signed him for his forthcoming film Pardes, starring Shah Rukh Khan and Mahima Chaudhary. His second film was Jab Pyaar Kisise Hota Hai starring Salman Khan and Twinkle Khanna. Narayan's role as Kabir Dhanrajgir earned him a Best Supporting Actor nomination at the 1999 Zee Cine Awards.

As a child artist, Narayan performed more than 100 songs and also released the album Aditya at Polygram Music (now Universal Music). His most successful song was "Chhota Baccha Jaan Ke" from the film Masoom in 1996. It also earned him his first major film award, the Screen Awards critics' Best Child Singer in 1997.  Narayan also received a special jury award at the Screen Awards as best child singer for the same song.

In 2006 he completed a diploma in English contemporary music at Tech Music Schools, in London. On his return to India, he was called to audition for Sa Re Ga Ma Pa Challenge 2007, and he became the anchor for that show. In April/May 2008 he toured North America and the West Indies, giving concerts together with his father, Udit Narayan.

In 2009 Narayan signed his first film as lead actor, Shaapit, directed by Vikram Bhatt, which was released worldwide on 19 March 2010. He sang four songs and also wrote and composed the title track for the film, Shaapit Hua.

Meanwhile, he continued working as a TV host, hosting Sa Re Ga Ma Pa Challenge 2009. In 2011, he hosted the reality show X Factor on Sony Entertainment Television.

In early 2012, Narayan joined Sanjay Leela Bhansali as an assistant director for the producer/director's next directorial venture, Goliyon Ki Raasleela Ram-Leela. He also performed two songs for the film, "Tattad Tattad", which was originally supposed to be rendered by his father Udit Narayan, and "Ishqaun Dhishqyaun".

In 2014 he released his first independent single "Tu Hi Pyar Hai" with Gabriella Demetriades. He created a band called The A Team in June 2014.

In 2015, Narayan hosted yet another successful season of Sa Re Ga Ma Pa L'il Champs.

Narayan released his second Hindi single on his birthday, 6 August titled "Tera Ishq Jee Paaun", starring Yoshika Verma, composed by Arijit Chakraborty and written by Manoj Yadav under the music label T-Series.

Narayan's first commercially successful single was released in December. Titled "Zindagi", the video starred Evgeniia Belousova and had music composed by Harshit Chauhan and written by Prashant Ingole under the music label T-Series.

In 2016, Narayan was back as host for SaReGaMaPa. The grand finale garnered record breaking TRP's and Narayan beat his own record of the most watched Grand Finale back when he was hosting Sa Re Ga Ma Pa Challenge 2009.

In March, Narayan released his fourth single titled "Mohabbat", composed and written by himself under the music label T-Series. It was the first music video to not to feature him in it and also the first single to be composed and written by Narayan. Both the song and music video under performed.

In August, Narayan released his fifth single titled "Behka Behka", composed and written by himself under the music label T-Series. It was the first music video in India to be shot entirely in reverse and flipped backwards and also the first music video to feature his band, Aditya Narayan & The A Team.

In December, Narayan released his sixth single titled "Yaara", starring Evgeniia Belousova, composed by Aditya Narayan and written by Prashant Ingole under the music label T-Series.

In 2017, Narayan hosted the sixth season of Sa Re Ga Ma Pa L'il Champs on Zee TV. He also took part in Entertainment Ki Raat on Colors TV.

In 2018, Narayan yet again hosted another successful season of Sa Re Ga Ma Pa on Zee TV.

In 2019, he participated in the ninth season of Colors TV popular stunt-based reality show Khatron Ke Khiladi where he ended as the runner-up losing to Punit Pathak. In March 2019, he started hosting the third season of singing reality show Rising Star. In April and May, he has many episodic appearances in Khatra Khatra Khatra. On 2 October, he released another single named "Lillah" on his YouTube channel. A music video was released on 7 October, featuring himself and Sushrii Shreya Mishraa.

In February 2020, Narayan featured in Tony Kakkar and Neha Kakkar's song "Goa Beach". In April, Narayan sang "Main Dooba Rahoon". In August, Narayan releases another independent single titled "Kyun". In September, Aditya Narayan was featured as the lead character as well as the associate director and producer of the Udit Narayan's solo single titled "Tere Bagair".

Television

Filmography

Music videos

Discography

As a playback singer

As a music director

Independent singles

Awards and nominations
1997 – Screen Awards - Special Jury Award for his song "Chhota Baccha Jaan Ke" from Masoom.
1999 – Zee Cine Awards - Nominated for the  Best Actor in a Supporting Role – Male for Jab Pyaar Kisise Hota Hai .
2011 – Ghanta Awards - Won Worst Breakthrough for Shaapit.
2014 – Producers Guild Film Awards -  Nominated for the  Best Male Playback Singer for "Tattad Tattad" & "Ishqyaun Dhishqyuan" from Goliyon Ki Raasleela Ram-Leela.

References

External links 

 
 
 

Living people
Bollywood playback singers
Indian male child actors
Indian male film actors
Indian male singers
People from Mumbai
1987 births
Fear Factor: Khatron Ke Khiladi participants
Nepali-language singers from India
Indian people of Nepalese descent